Catawba Falls is a series of waterfalls on the headwaters of the Catawba River, in McDowell County, near Old Fort, North Carolina.

Geology
The Catawba River flows over 2 major waterfalls in a short distance.  The first drop, called Upper Catawba Falls, consists of an upper free-fall drop, while the second drop a short distance downstream, often called just Catawba Falls, is a higher series of free-falls and cascades.

History
Catawba Falls is part of the Pisgah National Forest.  For many years, while the falls were located on public land, visitor access to the falls was heavily restricted.  The only access points to the falls were a trail that went through private property, and an access point off of Interstate 40.  Use of either access point was illegal.

In 2005 and 2007, the Foothills Conservancy of North Carolina purchased  of land at the end of Catawba River Road for a trailhead.  In 2010, after Congressional approval the property was transferred to the US Forest Service and access to the falls was officially opened to the public. In 2012, a new parking area was built by the Forest Service. The Forest Service plans further improvements, including a foot bridge over a tricky crossing of the river along the trail and a new trail to the upper falls, bypassing a section considered steep and dangerous.

References

Waterfalls of North Carolina
Pisgah National Forest
Protected areas of McDowell County, North Carolina
Catawba River
Landforms of McDowell County, North Carolina